The International Space Station has a large number of cameras, lenses, and other photography equipment on board.

List of cameras on ISS

Kodak 760C (e.g. Kodak DCS 760)
Nikon D1
Nikon D2Xs
Nikon D200
Nikon D3
Nikon D3X
Nikon D3S
Nikon D4
Nikon D800E
Nikon D5
Sony α7S II, which captured the first commercial 4K video footage in space in 2016.

Multi-function devices with a camera feature:
iPhone 4
HTC Nexus One
iPad 2

Installed hardware/experiments
 (no longer active) High Definition Earth-Viewing System (HDEV) 
4:3 standard definition CCTV cameras
EHDCA
A Nikon D4 in special housing with motor controlled zoom from 28-300
Two Raspberry Pi computers, one equipped with a standard camera and one with an infrared camera.

Camera equipment
Some of the modular lenses that are known to be used on the ISS include several lenses for Nikon cameras such as the D4. This includes the Nikon 24-70mm f/2.8E ED VR, the Nikon 800mm f/5.6E FL ED VR, and the Nikon AF-S FX TC-14E III 1.4x Teleconverter.

See also
Int-Ball
SPHERES

References

External links
Gateway to Astronaut best of 2015 crew observations

International Space Station
Cameras
Personal cameras and photography in space